The 2009 Chinese Super League season was the sixth season since the establishment of the Chinese Super League, the sixteenth season of a professional football league and the 48th top-tier league season in China. Beijing Guoan won their first ever Chinese Super League title.

The events during the 2008 season saw Liaoning relegated and Wuhan withdrawn. They were replaced by the promoted teams Jiangsu Sainty and Chongqing Lifan. Zhejiang Greentown which is located in Hangzhou, Zhejiang were renamed to Hangzhou Greentown.

Each team is allowed to register a maximum of five foreign players and field four of them in starting line-up this season, one of whom must be from an AFC country.

The league title sponsor is Italian tire manufacturer Pirelli. A three-year deal was announced on March 20, 2009. Nike have renewed sponsorship deal with Super League before season starts. CCTV, SMG and Sina became league partners and will broadcast live matches on TV and online across the country.

Clubs, stadiums & attendance
P – Promoted, TH – Title Holders

H1N1 flu pandemic
Chongqing Lifan reported an 8-player and 3-crew infection of H1N1 flu virus on 10 September. Its matches in Round 22, 23 and 24 were postponed by Chinese FA.

League table

Positions by round

Results

Top scorers
Updated to games played on 31 Oct 2009.

Hat-tricks
Xu Liang of Guangzhou GPC scored the first hat-trick of the season against Dalian Shide at Yuexiushan Stadium on 6 April 2009.
Qu Bo of Qingdao Jonoon scored a hat-trick against Chongqing Lifan at Qingdao Tiantai Stadium on 8 August 2009.
Hernán Barcos of Shenzhen Asia Travel scored a hat-trick against Changchun Yatai at Shenzhen Stadium on 12 September 2009.
Emil Martínez of Beijing Guoan scored a hat-trick against Hangzhou Greentown at Workers Stadium on 31 October 2009.

Managerial changes

Awards
 Chinese Football Association Footballer of the Year:  Samuel Caballero (Changchun Yatai)
 Chinese Super League Golden Boot Winner:  Luis Ramírez (Guangzhou GPC),  Hernán Barcos (Shenzhen)
 Chinese Football Association Young Player of the Year:  Deng Zhuoxiang (Jiangsu Sainty)
 Chinese Football Association Manager of the Year:  Tang Yaodong (Henan Jianye)
 Chinese Football Association Referee of the Year:  Sun Baojie

See also
2009 in Chinese football

References

External links
 Chinese Super League official site 
 Match Centre on FIFA official site 
 China 2009 on RSSSF

 

Chinese Super League seasons
1
China
China